Spišský Štvrtok (before 1927 "Štvrtok"; ,) is a village and municipality in Levoča District in the Prešov Region of central-eastern Slovakia. In historical records the village was first mentioned in 1263. The municipality lies at an elevation of 560 metres and covers an area of 14.237 km². It has a population of about 2,334 people.

The name of the village means "Thursday", referring to its historical market-day.

People
Mikuláš Dzurinda, former prime minister of Slovakia.
Štefan Sečka, a former Roman Catholic auxiliary bishop of the Roman Catholic Diocese of Spiš

References

External links
The official webpage.

Villages and municipalities in Levoča District
Spiš